Industrial techno is a subgenre of techno and industrial dance music that originated in the 1990s. Characteristically, it incorporates influences from the bleak, noisy sound and aesthetics of early industrial music acts, particularly Cabaret Voltaire and Throbbing Gristle. American industrial music label Wax Trax! also had a profound influence over the genre's development. The genre has seen a resurgence in the 2010s, spearheaded by acts such as Adam X, Orphx, and Ancient Methods, and others later like Blawan and Karenn. As a result, it has gained a significant fanbase from the post-dubstep audience. It is not to be mistaken with Techno Industrial, which is in essence similar to the power noise/rhythmic noise subgenre. The different terminology is used depending if one is coming from a techno perspective or industrial perspective, with Industrial Techno having more techno-inspired rhythmic section with many reverb and wall-of-noise or sci-fi effects, while Techno Industrial is closer to rhythmic noise in composition, with a distorted rhythmic section. Other artists associated with industrial techno include Cut Hands, Helena Hauff, Forward Strategy Group, Surgeon, Michael Forshaw, Jeff Mills, Regis, Dominick Fernow and Mike Banks. Perc Trax record label has been credited with the revival of the genre in the UK, with artists such as Perc, Truss, Hppa and Ansome.

See also
Post-industrial music

References

20th-century music genres
Techno genres
Industrial music
British styles of music